Sergi Bruguera and Goran Ivanišević were the defending champions, but were eliminated in the round-robin competition.

Mansour Bahrami and Fabrice Santoro won the title, defeating Pat Cash and Michael Chang in the final, 7–6(7–3), 6–3.

Draw

Final

Group C
Standings are determined by: 1. number of wins; 2. number of matches; 3. in three-players-ties, percentage of sets won, or of games won; 4. steering-committee decision.

Group D
Standings are determined by: 1. number of wins; 2. number of matches; 3. in three-players-ties, percentage of sets won, or of games won; 4. steering-committee decision.

References
Main Draw

Legends Over 45 Doubles